Astrid Park is an urban public park in the municipality of Anderlecht in Brussels, Belgium. The park was inaugurated on 13 August 1911 and was named the / ("Meir Park") until 1935, when the mayor of Anderlecht decided to change its name in memory of Queen Astrid, the first wife of King Leopold III, who died in a car crash that year. 

Since 1917, football club R.S.C. Anderlecht plays its home matches in the Constant Vanden Stock Stadium (currently known as Lotto Park for sponsorship reasons), located within the park. Hence, the stadium is sometimes metonymically referred to as Parc Astrid.

This park is served by the metro stations Saint Guidon/Sint Guido and Veeweyde/Veeweide on line 5 of the Brussels Metro.

See also

 List of parks and gardens in Brussels

References
 Anderlecht page on Parc Astrid 
 Same, in Dutch 

Parks in Brussels
Urban public parks
Anderlecht
R.S.C. Anderlecht